Anthony Hartley (1925–2000) was a writer and critic. After studying at Exeter College, Oxford University he reviewed poetry for The Spectator. He moved to New York City in 1967. His books included A State of England (1963), and Gaullism: the Rise and Fall of a Political Movement (1972), and he edited The Penguin Book of French Verse in 1959.

References

1925 births
2000 deaths
British literary critics
British non-fiction writers
British male writers
20th-century non-fiction writers
Alumni of Exeter College, Oxford
Male non-fiction writers